That Healin' Feelin' (subtitled The United States of Mind Phase 1) is an album by jazz pianist Horace Silver released on the Blue Note label in 1970, featuring performances by Silver with Randy Brecker, George Coleman, Houston Person, Bob Cranshaw, Jimmy Lewis, Mickey Roker and Idris Muhammad with vocals by Andy Bey, Gail Nelson and Jackie Verdell. It is the first of a trilogy of albums later compiled on CD as The United States of Mind.

Reception
The Allmusic review by Ron Wynn awarded the album 3 stars and simply states: "Lyrics a bit to the pretentious side; music overcomes it".

Track listing
All compositions by Horace Silver
 "That Healin' Feelin" - 3:54
 "The Happy Medium" - 4:58
 "The Show Has Begun" - 4:11
 "Love Vibrations" - 4:03
 "Peace" - 3:26
 "Permit Me to Introduce You to Yourself" - 3:13
 "Wipe Away the Evil" - 4:15
 "Nobody Knows" - 4:12
 "There's Too Much to Be Done" - 4:11

Recorded on April 8 (1-5) and June 18 (6-9), 1970.

Personnel
Tracks 1-5
Horace Silver - piano, electric piano
Randy Brecker - trumpet, flugelhorn
George Coleman - tenor saxophone
Bob Cranshaw - electric bass
Mickey Roker - drums
Andy Bey - vocals (2-5)

Tracks 6-9
Horace Silver - piano, electric piano
Randy Brecker - trumpet, flugelhorn
Houston Person - tenor saxophone
Jimmy Lewis - electric bass
Idris Muhammad - drums
Gail Nelson (6), Jackie Verdell (7-9) - vocals

References

Horace Silver albums
1970 albums
Blue Note Records albums
Albums produced by Francis Wolff
Albums produced by George Butler (record producer)
Albums recorded at Van Gelder Studio